"I Don't Feel Like Loving You Today" is a song recorded by American country music artist Gretchen Wilson.  It was released in October 2005 as the second single from the album All Jacked Up.  The song reached #22 on the Billboard Hot Country Songs chart.  The song was written by Matraca Berg and Jim Collins.

Chart performance

References

2006 singles
2005 songs
Gretchen Wilson songs
Songs written by Matraca Berg
Songs written by Jim Collins (singer)
Song recordings produced by John Rich
Song recordings produced by Mark Wright (record producer)
Epic Records singles